Adam Eriksson may refer to:

 Adam Eriksson (footballer, born 1988), Swedish footballer for Ljungskile SK
 Adam Eriksson (footballer, born 1990), Swedish footballer for Helsingborgs IF